Peter Faber (born 9 October 1943, in Schwarzenbach an der Saale, Germany) is a Dutch stage, television and film actor.

Biography
Faber was born in Germany, to a set of parents who beat him regularly; he was rebellious from an early age. They moved to Amsterdam-Noord when he was six. His mother left with another man, and his father had to make do working whatever job was available. At sixteen, Faber left home and roamed around for a while.

Early career 
Faber was co-founder of Het Werkteater and twice won a Louis d'Or for his roles in Het Koekoeksnest and Avondrood.

Television and film career 
International audiences may know Peter Faber from star-studded A Bridge Too Far or Paul Verhoeven's internationally successful war epic Soldier of Orange. At the time he also played in Max Havelaar. In the 80s Faber starred as John Gisberts in Dutch box office hit Schatjes! and its sequel Mama is boos!.

Later activities 
Faber played in the musical De Jantjes (1998), as Captain Hook in the musical Peter Pan. In 2007 he performed in his one-manshow Caveman and in the children's show Elk kind is Kampioen!. In 2018, Faber had a leading role in the RTL 4 alternative comedy series Beter Laat Dan Nooit, where he travels around the world with other Dutch celebrities, who include Gerard Cox, Willibrord Frequin and Barrie Stevens.

Faber teaches at the Amsterdamse Theaterschool, de Kleinkunst Academie and the Frank Sanders Musical Academie.

Filmography, television and theatre 

Warning to Wantons (1948) - Unknown part (not credited)
Makkers staakt uw wild geraas (1960) - Unknown part
La ragazza in vetrina (1961) - Unknown part
Surprise Surprise (1969) - Lover
De worstelaar (1970) - Unknown part
Keetje Tippel (1975) - George
Rooie Sien (1975) - Gerrit van Buren
Mens erger je niet (1975) - Unknown part
De laatste trein (1975) - Unknown part
Toestanden (1976) - Unknown part
Alle dagen feest (1976) - Wessel Franken
Max Havelaar (1976) - Max Havelaar
Dokter Vlimmen (1977) - Dokter Vlimmen
A Bridge Too Far (1977) - Capt. Harry Bestebreurtje
Soldier of Orange (1977) - Will Dostgaarde
Prettig weekend, meneer Meijer (television film, 1978) - Unknown part
 (1978) - Karlsen
Exit 7 (1978) - Marc Dumont
Camping (1978) - Guus
De proefkonijnen (1979) - Herman
Een vrouw als Eva (1979) - Ad
Mijn vriend (1979) - Jules Depraeter
Duel in de diepte television series - El Loco (1979)
Het teken van het beest (1980) - Dirk Tabak
Charlotte (1981) - Frits Blech
Te gek om los te lopen (1981) - Piet
Van de koele meren des doods (1982) - Joop
Een zaak van leven of dood (1983) - Hans Jansonius
De wil voor de werkelijkheid (1984) - Unknown part
Schatjes! (1984) - John Gisberts
Ciske de Rat (1984) - Father Cor
Paul Chevrolet en de ultieme hallucinatie (1985) - Leopold/Paul Chevrolet
Mama is Boos! (1986) - John Gisberts
 (1987) - De Gier
Mijn vader woont in Rio (1989) - Jacob
De gulle minnaar (1990) - Peter Heg
Prettig geregeld television series - Joris Huisman (1988–1991)
Van Gogh's Ear (1992) - Nico
Heading for England (1993) - Father of Hans
Oeroeg (1993) - Van Bergen Henegouwen
De club television series - Club owner (1995)
De zeemeerman (1996) - Simon
Flodder television series - Bob (Episode: Inzet, 1997)
Windkracht 10 television series - Willem (Episode: Geen zee te hoog, 1997)
Baantjer television series - Felix Wolf (Episode: De Cock en de moord op het menu, 1997)
Baantjer, de film: De Cock en de wraak zonder einde (television film, 1999) - Donald Heerooms
Verkeerd verbonden television series - Theo (Episode: Twee op de wip, 2000)
Onderweg naar morgen television series - Melchior Vehmeijer (2001)
Séance (2004) - Hypnotist
K3 en het ijsprinsesje (2006) - King Flurkentijn
M.A.N. (2007) - Unknown part
De kleine prins family theatre (2007) - Pilot
Van Speijk television series (2006-2007)- Detective Evert Beukering (23 afl.)
Piet Piraat en het zwaard van Zilvertand (2008) - Kapitein Eksteroog
De Man van La Mancha musical (2008–2009) - Don Quixote
De Magische Wereld van Pardoes television series (2011) - Grootmeester Almar
Redbad (2018)

References

External links 
 
  Filmfoto's van Peter Faber

1943 births
Living people
Dutch male film actors
Dutch male stage actors
Dutch male television actors
People from Hof (district)
20th-century Dutch male actors